Quercus libani, the Lebanon oak, is a species of oak native to the eastern Mediterranean in western Asia, including in Lebanon, western Syria, northeastern Israel, eastern Turkey, and northern Iraq and Iran.

Description
The deciduous leaf is slender, elongated and often asymmetrical, its base is round and its tip is slightly pointed. In the adult state the leaf's upper side is dark green and the under side is pale green.

The flowers are monoecious, meaning that flowers from both sexes can be found on the same tree. They are pollinated by wind. Its length is half covered by the cupule.

Habitat 
The Lebanon oak can grow in medium loamy to heavy clay soils, with no preference to soil acidity. The tree can grow in direct sunlight to semi-shade. It can endure strong winds, but not salty maritime exposures.

Cultivation

Ornamental tree
Quercus libani is cultivated and planted as an ornamental tree in gardens, parks, and habitat restoration projects. It is successful in drought-tolerant landscape gardens.

The tree does not tolerate root disturbance well, therefore landscape trees should not be moved once planted, or transplanted from native habitats. Acorns sown in situ will produce the best trees, in growth rate and deep rooted drought tolerance. The acorns are sown as they ripen. Acorns lose their viability if they dry out, and so need to be kept in a moist and cool place away from rodents until planting.

Biological pest control
The leaf litter of the Lebanon oak is used as a biological pest control—herbivore insect repellent for protecting other plants. Its leaves placed as a mulch layer around vulnerable plants effectively repels snails, slugs, and grubs. Fresh leaves can inhibit plant growth, and so are not used directly from the tree. Being deciduous, much beneficial leaf litter is produced in the autumn.

Uses 
Lebanon oak wood is very hard and resistant to insect and fungal attack and is used in construction.

Food
The acorns are very bitter due to high concentrations of tannins. This bitter taste can be leached out by washing the acorns in running water, but this causes the loss of many beneficial minerals.

The acorns can be dried and ground it into a powder and used to thicken stews and may be mixed with cereals for making bread. The roasted bitter acorns may be used as a coffee substitute.

Medicinal
Galls produced by  the larvae of different insects that may be found on the trees have especially high tannin concentrations, are highly astringent and were used in the treatment of haemorrhage and diarrhea. Tannin from the galls are also used as dye.

References

libani
Medicinal plants
Trees of Mediterranean climate
Garden plants of Asia
Ornamental trees
Plant toxin insecticides
Plants described in 1801
Flora of Lebanon and Syria